A stayer is a horse that may be a better horse racing performer over a longer distance, such as more than . Sometimes, the term may also refer to a horse that is not able to quicken or speed up.

References

External links
Traits of a stayer

Horse racing terminology